Drepanulatrix is a genus of moths in the family Geometridae.

Species
 Drepanulatrix baueraria Sperry, 1948
 Drepanulatrix bifilata (Hulst, 1880)
 Drepanulatrix carnearia (Hulst, 1888)
 Drepanulatrix falcataria (Packard, 1873)
 Drepanulatrix foeminaria (Guenée, 1857)
 Drepanulatrix garneri Blanchard & Knudson, 1985
 Drepanulatrix hulstii (Dyar, 1903)
 Drepanulatrix monicaria (Guenée, 1857)
 Drepanulatrix nevadaria (Hulst, 1888)
 Drepanulatrix quadraria (Grote, 1882)
 Drepanulatrix secundaria Barnes & McDunnough, 1916
 Drepanulatrix unicalcararia (Guenée, 1857)

References
 Drepanulatrix at Markku Savela's Lepidoptera and Some Other Life Forms
 Natural History Museum Lepidoptera genus database

Caberini
Geometridae genera